Fur is the debut full-length album by London-based band Archie Bronson Outfit. It was released on 26 July 2004.

Track listing
"Butterflies" – 3:45
"Islands" – 3:07
"Here He Comes" – 2:21
"Riders" – 3:56
"Bloodheat" – 5:23
"On the Shore" – 3:52
"The Wheel Rolls On" – 4:08
"Armour for a Broken Heart" – 2:31
"Kangaroo Heart" – 3:06
"Pompeii" – 5:27

Singles
"Kangaroo Heart" (23 February 2004, Domino Records)
"Islands" (5 July 2004, Domino Records, #102 UK)
"Here He Comes" (8 November 2004, Domino Records)

2004 albums
Archie Bronson Outfit albums
Domino Recording Company albums